This is a timeline documenting events of jazz in the year 2015.

Events

January 
 21 – The 4th Bodø Jazz Open started in Bodø, Norway (January 21 – 24).
 23 – The 34th annual Djangofestival started on Cosmopolite in Oslo, Norway (January 23 – 24).

February
 5
 The 17th Polarjazz Festival started in Longyearbyen, Svalbard  (February 5 – 8).
 The 10th Ice Music Festival started in Geilo, Norway (February 5 – 8).

March
 6 – The 11th Jakarta International Java Jazz Festival started in Jakarta, Indonesia (March 6 – 8).
 27 – The 42nd Vossajazz started in Voss, Norway (March 27 – 29).
 28
 Thea Hjelmeland was awarded Vossajazzprisen 2015 for the album Solar Plexus.
 Live Maria Roggen performs the commissioned work Apukaluptein at Vossajazz.

April
 23 – The 21st SoddJazz started in Inderøy, Norway (April 23 – 27).
 30 – The International Jazz Day.

May
 5 – The 27th MaiJazz started in Stavanger, Norway (May 5 – 10).
 6 – The 11th AnJazz started in Hamar, Norway (May 6 – 9).
 7
 Julie Dahle Aagård played at Uhørt in Oslo, Norway.
 Lisa Ekdahl play at Rockefeller in Oslo, Norway.
 Bergen Big Band with Gabriel Fliflet and Ole Hamre played at Sardinen USF in Bergen, Norway.
 The 37th Trondheim Jazz Festival started in Trondheim, Norway (May 7 – 10).
 8
 Per Mathisen Trio played at Draaben Bar in Sandefjord, Norway.
 Hanna Paulsberg Concept / Soil Collectors / MOPO played at Victoria - Nasjonal Jazzscene Oslo, Norway.
 10 – Kampenjazz: Anja Eline Skybakmoen played at Cafeteatret Oslo, Norway.
 15 – Per Mathisen Trio played at Victoria - National Jazz Scene in Oslo, Norway.
 16 – Farmers Market played at Victoria - National Jazz Scene in Oslo, Norway.
 22
 The 44th Moers Festival starts in Moers, Germany (May 22 – 25)
 Eivind Opsvik Overseas played at Victoria - National Jazz Scene in Oslo, Norway.
 23 – Beady Belle played at Victoria - National Jazz Scene in Oslo, Norway.
 28
 The 4th Torino Jazz Festival started in Turin (May 28 - June 2).
 The 43rd Nattjazz 2015 started in Bergen, Norway (May 28 – June 6)
 Bergen Big Band was the very first recipients of Olav Dale's Memorial Award at the opening of Nattjazz 2015.

June
 17 – The 27th Jazz Fest Wien started in Vienna, Austria (June 26 – July 11).
 26 – The 35th Montreal International Jazz Festival started in Montreal, Quebec, Canada (June 26 – July 5).

July
 1
 The 51st Kongsberg Jazzfestival started at Kongsberg, Norway (July 1 – 4).
 Ellen Andrea Wang was recipient of the Kongsberg Jazz Award or DNB.prisen 2015 at the Kongsberg Jazzfestival.
 2
 The 15th Stavernfestivalen started in Stavern, Norway (July 2 – 4).
 The 25th JazzBaltica starts in Schloss Salzau close to Kiel, Germany (July 2 – 5).
 3
 The 37th Copenhagen Jazz Festival started in Copenhagen, Denmark (July 3 – 12).
 The 49th Montreux Jazz Festival started in Montreux, Switzerland (July 3 – 18).
 7 – The 68th Nice Jazz Festival started in Nice, France (July 7 – 12).
 10 – The 40th North Sea Jazz Festival started in Rotterdam, Netherlands (July 10 – 12).
 11
 The 27th Aarhus Jazz Festival started in Aarhus, Denmark (July 11 – 18).
 The 50th Pori Jazz Festival started in Pori, Finland (July 11 – 19).
 13 – The 55th Moldejazz started in Molde, Norway with Mats Gustafsson as artist in residence (July 13 – 18).
 16 – Jan Ole Otnæs received the 2015 Molderosen at Moldejazz.
 22 – The 20th Canal Street started in Arendal, Norway (July 22 – 25).
 31 – The 59th Newport Jazz Festival started in Newport, Rhode Island (July 31 – August 2).

August
 5 – The 29th Sildajazz 2015 started in Haugesund, Norway (August 5 – 9).
 6 – The 21st Hemnesjazz 2015 started in Hemnesberget, Norway (August 6 – 9).
 8 – The 4th Kids in Jazz 2015 festival started in Oslo, Norway as part of the Oslo Jazzfestival (August 8 – 12).
 10 – The 30th Oslo Jazzfestival started in Oslo, Norway (August 10 – 15).
 11 – The 17th Øyafestivalen started in Oslo, Norway (August 11 – 15).
 12 – Anneli Drecker played at Øyafestivalen.

September
 3 – The 11th Punktfestivalen started in Kristiansand, Norway (September 3 – 5).
 18 – The 58th Monterey Jazz Festival started in Monterey, California (September 18 – 20).

October
 9 – The 32nd Stockholm Jazz Festival started in Stockholm, Sweden (October 9 – 18).

November
 13 – The 24th London Jazz Festival started in London, England (November 13 – 22).

December
 29 – The 10th RIBBEjazz started in Lillestrøm, Norway.

Album released

January

February

March

April

May

June

July

August

September

October

November

December

Deaths

 January
 1 – Jeff Golub, American guitarist (born 1955).
 3 – Ivan Jullien, French trumpeter (born 1934).
 4 – Pino Daniele, Italian singer, songwriter, and guitarist (born 1955).
 19 – Ward Swingle, American vocalist and pianist, The Swingle Singers (born 1927).

 February
 3 – William Thomas McKinley, American composer and pianist (born 1938).
 12 – Richie Pratt, American drummer (born 1943).
 21 – Clark Terry, American trumpeter (born 1920).
 22 – Erik Amundsen, Norwegian upright bassist (born 1937).

 March
 8 – Lew Soloff, American trumpeter, composer, and actor (born 1944).
 13 – Daevid Allen, Australian poet, guitarist, singer, composer, and performance artist, Soft Machine and Gong (born 1938).
 15
 Bob Parlocha, American saxophonist and gourmet cook (born 1938).
 Mike Porcaro, American bassist, Toto (born 1955).
 20 – Paul Jeffrey, American tenor saxophonist, arranger, and educator (born 1933). 
 21 – Jørgen Ingmann, Danish guitarist (born 1925).
 26 – John Renbourn, English guitarist and songwriter (born 1944).
 27 – Johnny Helms, American trumpeter and bandleader (born 1935).
 31 – Ralph Sharon, Anglo-American pianist and arranger (born 1923).

 April
 6 – Milton DeLugg, American pianoist, accordionist, and composer (born 1918).
 27 – Marty Napoleon, American pianist (born 1921).

 May
 3 – Ben Aronov, American pianist (born 1932).
 6 – Jerome Cooper, American drummer (born 1946).
 14 – B.B. King, American guitarist (born 1925).
 20
 Bob Belden, American saxophonist (born 1956).
 Simon Flem Devold, Norwegian clarinetist and columnist (born 1927).
 23 – Marcus Belgrave, American trumpeter (born 1936).
 28 – Ray Kennedy, American pianist (born 1957).
 31 – Slim Richey, American guitarist (born 1938).

 June
 8 – Paul Bacon, American musician and book and album cover designer (born 1923).
 9 – James Last,  German composer and big band leader, James Last Orchestra (born 1929).
 11 – Ornette Coleman, American saxophonist (born 1930).
 12 – Monica Lewis, American singer and actress (born 1922).
 13 – Big Time Sarah, American singer (born 1953).
 19 – Harold Battiste, American saxophonist, pianist, and composer (born 1931).
 21 – Gunther Schuller, American composer, conductor, and horn player (born 1925).
 30 – Eddy Louiss, French Hammond organist, Les Double Six (born 1941).

 July
 6 – Masabumi Kikuchi, Japanese jazz pianist and composer (born 1939).
 15 – Howard Rumsey, American upright bassist (born 1917).
 17 – John Taylor, British pianist and composer (born 1942).
 19 – Van Alexander, American bandleader, arranger, and composer (born 1915).

 August
 13 – Harold Ousley, American tenor saxophonist and flautist (born 1929).
 14 – Jazz Summers, British music manager (lung cancer), Scissor Sisters, The Verve, and Snow Patrol (born 1944).
 30 – Hugo Rasmussen, Danish bassist (born 1941).

 September
 27 – Wilton Felder, American saxophonist and bassist, The Crusaders (born 1940).
 29 – Phil Woods, American saxophonist, clarinetist, bandleader and composer (born 1931).

 October
 3 – Dave Pike, American vibraphone and marimba player (born 1938).
 9 – Larry Rosen, American drummer, entrepreneur, and music producer (born 1940).
 20 – Don Rendell, English saxophonist, flautist, and clarinetist (born 1926).
 22 – Mark Murphy, American singer (born 1932).
 24 – Nat Peck, American trombonist (born 1925).

 November
 5
 Kjell Öhman, Swedish pianist, hammond organist, and accordionist (born 1943).
 Nora Brockstedt, Norwegian singer (born 1923).
 9 – Andy White, Scottish drummer (born 1930).
 17 – Al Aarons, American trumpeter (born 1932).
 23
 Bengt-Arne Wallin, Swedish composer, arrangeur, trumpeter, and flugelhornist (born 1926).
 Cynthia Robinson, American trumpeter and vocalist, Sly and the Family Stone (born 1944).
 25 – Svein Christiansen, Norwegian drummer (born 1941).

December
 9 – Rusty Jones, American drummer (born 1942).
 28 – Joe Houston, American tenor saxophonist (born 1926).
 31
 Natalie Cole, American singer, songwriter, and actress (congestive heart failure) (born 1950).
 Dal Richards, Canadian big band leader (born 1918).

See also

 List of 2015 albums
 List of years in jazz
 2010s in jazz
 2015 in music

References 

2010s in jazz
Jazz